Kilgi may refer to several places in Estonia:

Kilgi, Pärnu County, village in Varbla Parish, Pärnu County
Kilgi, Rapla County, village in Märjamaa Parish, Rapla County